This is the complete list of women's Universiade medalists in athletics from 1959 to 2019.

Events

100m

200m

400 m

800m

1500m

3000m

5000m

10,000m

Half marathon

Marathon

100m hurdles
80m until 1967

400m hurdles

3000m steeplechase

5km walk

10km walk

20 km walk

20 km walk team

Half marathon team

4x100m relay

4x400m relay

High jump

Pole vault

Long jump

Triple jump

Shot put

Discus

Hammer throw

Javelin

Pentathlon

Heptathlon

References

Universiade
Universiade